Brenda and the Big Dudes was a South African recording group formed in 1983. The group's classic line up included Brenda Fassie (Vocals), Desmond Malotana (Keyboards), Dumisane Ngubeni (Keyboards), Job "Fats" Mlangeni (Drums), David Mabaso (Bass) and Rufus Klaas (Guitar). The group rose to fame after the release of their debut maxi-single Weekend Special in 1983. The single became the best selling record in South Africa with sales of over 200,000 copies. The group was initially a backing band for another popular South African duo Blondie & Pappa until a young Brenda Fassie was brought in as a lead singer. The group would also gain international prominence after Weekend Special was remixed by Van Gibbs in 1986. This Version entered the Hot R&B/Hip-Hop Songs chart where it peaked at number 72 on April 12, 1986 and spent 8 weeks in the chart.

Band members 
 Brenda Fassie (1983-1987) : Vocals
 Desmond Malotana (1983-1987) : Keyboards
 Dumisane Ngubeni (1983-1987) : Keyboards
 David Mabaso (1983-1987) : Bass
 Rufus Klaas (1983-1987) : Guitar
 Job "Fats" Mlangeni (1983-1987) : Drums

Discography

Studio albums 
Weekend Special (1983)
Let's Stick Together (1984)
Higher and Higher (1985)
No! No! Señor (1986)

Extended plays 
Cool Spot (1984)
Touch Somebody (1985)

Singles 
Someone To Love (1984)

See also 
 Afropop

References 

South African pop music groups